Bugarach is a commune in the Aude department in southern France, around 35 km south of Carcassonne. The economy is based on agriculture and tourism, attracting many New Age adherents.

Geography
Bugarach is at the foot of Pic de Bugarach, a  mountain peak and the highest summit in the Corbières Massif. The peak is also called the "upside down mountain" as the top layers of rock are older than the lower layers due to uplift of the Pyrenees.

It is also located on the Green Meridian.

History

The location is mentioned for the first time as Villa Burgaragio in 889 AD; it derives from the name "Bugari" of the Bulgarian Bogomilis in medieval France. In the 18th century the village became known for manufacturing wooden tools and hats. In modern times many esoteric and UFO legends have been connected to this place.

Economy
The major economic activity of the village and surrounding region is agriculture and tourism. Demand for holiday cottages and popularity with New Age followers led to a rise in real estate prices.

Population

Cult settlements
In the 1960s and 70s Pic de Bugarach became popular with the hippie movement. Later in the 20th century it became popular with New Age followers who believed the "upside down mountain" had mystical powers, spreading to the belief that the village would be spared in the 2012 apocalypse.

Cult followers believe aliens reside inside the mountain and will spare any humans that decide to leave the planet with them in the coming apocalypse. In 2011, the number of visitors doubled to over 20,000 and France's cult watchdog, Miviludes, placed the village under scrutiny due to concern over possible mass suicides. The mayor even considered calling the army over concerns caused by this issue.

See also
Communes of the Aude department

References

Communes of Aude
Aude communes articles needing translation from French Wikipedia